S J C Institute of Technology (SJCIT), or in its full name Sri Jagadguru Chandrashekaranatha Swamiji Institute of Technology, is an Engineering college located in the city of Chikballapur, Chikballapur district, Karnataka, India, about 20 Kilometers from Bangalore International Airport. It was established in 1986 by the Sri Adichunchanagiri Shikshana Trust under Sri Balagangadharanatha Swamiji and is operated by that trust, which also operates various sister colleges across Karnataka. The college is affiliated to Visvesvaraya Technological University.

Courses 

 Undergraduate: (B.E.)
 Computer Science & Engineering
 Electronics & Communication Engineering
 Aeronautical Engineering
 Civil Engineering
 Information Science & Engineering
 Mechanical Engineering
 Aerospace Engineering
 Artificial Intelligence & Machine Learning
 Post-graduate : MBA, MTech

External links 
 

Engineering colleges in Karnataka
Educational institutions established in 1986
1986 establishments in Karnataka
Universities and colleges in Chikkaballapur district